Child Marriage in Togo. In 2017 in Togo, 22% of girls are married off before age 18. 6% are married before they turn 15.

References

Togo
Childhood in Africa
Society of Togo
Violence against women in Togo
Marriage in Africa